J. A. Moreno (born July 28, 1993) is a music video director from Barcelona, Spain known for his work with artists such as Steve Aoki, Sting, will.i.am, Karol G, Camila Cabello, Paris Hilton, Lay Zhang, AGNEZ MO, Farruko, Becky G, Tini, Anitta, CNCO, Paulina Rubio, Dimitri Vegas & Like Mike, Desiigner and Afrojack.

Early life and career 
Moreno was born on July 28, 1993 in Barcelona, Spain.  Growing up J. A. was inspired by director Nicolas Winding Refn for his artistic style as a director. As a teenager Moreno started filming concert and event videos in the clubs of Barcelona and in 2018 he moved from Barcelona to Los Angeles.

Moreno's first came to prominence in July 2016 when he collaborated with Luka Caro and Juicy M to direct Obey.  Afterwards Moreno began collaborating with record labels such as Universal Music, Sony Music, and Spinnin’ Records.

After two years of traveling and working in Barcelona, Moreno decided to move to Los Angeles in 2018 to pursue his career.  Since moving to Los Angeles, he has worked with artists such as Steve Aoki, Sting, will.i.am, Karol G, Camila Cabello, Paris Hilton, Lay Zhang, AGNEZ MO, Farruko, Dimitri Vegas & Like Mike, Desiigner, Afrojack, SHAED and Cheat Codes (DJs).

Filmography

Music videos

References

External links 
www.jamoreno.tv

Living people
1993 births
Spanish music video directors
People from Barcelona